Stigmidium is a genus of lichenicolous (lichen-eating) fungi in the family Mycosphaerellaceae. The genus was circumscribed by Italian botanist Vittore Benedetto Antonio Trevisan de Saint-Léon in 1860, with Stigmidium schaereri assigned as the type species.

Species
Stigmidium acetabuli 
Stigmidium aggregatum 
Stigmidium ahtii 
Stigmidium alectoriae 
Stigmidium allogenum 
Stigmidium apophlaeae 
Stigmidium arthoniae 
Stigmidium arthrorhaphidis 
Stigmidium ascophylli 
Stigmidium aspiciliae 
Stigmidium bellemerei 
Stigmidium beringicum 
Stigmidium buelliae 
Stigmidium californicum 
Stigmidium calopadiae 
Stigmidium caloplacae 
Stigmidium cartilagineae 
Stigmidium catapyrenii 
Stigmidium cerinae 
Stigmidium cladoniicola 
Stigmidium clauzadei 
Stigmidium coarctatae 
Stigmidium collematis 
Stigmidium concentricum 
Stigmidium congestum 
Stigmidium croceae 
Stigmidium cupulare 
Stigmidium degelii 
Stigmidium disconephromeum 
Stigmidium ephebes 
Stigmidium epinesolechia 
Stigmidium epiphyllum 
Stigmidium epiramalina 
Stigmidium epistigmellum 
Stigmidium epixanthum 
Stigmidium eucline 
Stigmidium exasperatum 
Stigmidium frigidum 
Stigmidium fuscatae 
Stigmidium glebarum 
Stigmidium grex 
Stigmidium gyrophorarum 
Stigmidium haesitans 
Stigmidium hageniae 
Stigmidium hesperium 
Stigmidium heterodermiae 
Stigmidium humidum 
Stigmidium hypotrachynicola 
Stigmidium joergensenii 
Stigmidium johnii 
Stigmidium kashiwadanii 
Stigmidium lecidellae 
Stigmidium lendemeri 
Stigmidium leprariae 
Stigmidium leptogii 
Stigmidium lichenum 
Stigmidium lobariae 
Stigmidium marinum 
Stigmidium mayrhoferi 
Stigmidium micareae 
Stigmidium microcarpum 
Stigmidium microspilum 
Stigmidium microsporum 
Stigmidium mitchellii 
Stigmidium mycobilimbiae 
Stigmidium neofusceliae 
Stigmidium parasiticum 
Stigmidium parmotrematis 
Stigmidium parvum 
Stigmidium peltideae 
Stigmidium petri 
Stigmidium placopsidis 
Stigmidium placynthii 
Stigmidium porinae 
Stigmidium pseudopeltideae 
Stigmidium pumilum 
Stigmidium punctillum 
Stigmidium ramalinae 
Stigmidium rivulorum 
Stigmidium rouxianum 
Stigmidium schaereri 
Stigmidium schizosporum 
Stigmidium seirophorae 
Stigmidium solorinarium 
Stigmidium spegazzinii 
Stigmidium squamariae 
Stigmidium squamarinicola 
Stigmidium stereocaulorum 
Stigmidium stygnospilum 
Stigmidium subcladoniicola 
Stigmidium superpositum 
Stigmidium tabacinae 
Stigmidium tetrasporum 
Stigmidium trichotheliorum 
Stigmidium triebelae 
Stigmidium vezdae 
Stigmidium xanthoparmeliarum

References

Mycosphaerellaceae genera
Dothideomycetes genera
Lichenicolous fungi
Taxa described in 1860
Taxa named by Vittore Benedetto Antonio Trevisan de Saint-Léon